Ham-sur-Heure-Nalinnes is a municipality of Wallonia located in the province of Hainaut, Belgium. 

On January 1, 2018, Ham-sur-Heure-Nalinnes had a total population of 13,529.

The municipality consists of the following districts: Cour-sur-Heure, Ham-sur-Heure (Han-so-Eure), Jamioulx (Djanmioû), Marbaix-la-Tour (Marbwê) and Nalinnes (Nålene).

References

External links
 
  Official site of the municipality of Ham-sur-Heure-Nalinnes

Municipalities of Hainaut (province)